Yu Min (16 August 1926 – 16 January 2019) was a prominent Chinese nuclear physicist, an academic of Chinese Academy of Sciences (CAS), a lead nuclear weapon designer in the Ninth Academy, and a recipient of Two Bombs, One Satellite Achievement Medal. Though he personally refused to accept the title, he is honored as “the father of Chinese Hydrogen Bomb”.

Life 
He was born in Tianjin in August 1926. He was famous for his excellent performances in Yaohua High School. Later he was admitted by Department of Electronics of Peking University, however, out of the passion for the physical theories, he transferred into Department of Physics to work on  theory.

From 1949, Yu started his postgraduate research in the Department of Physics of Peking University, and also served as a teaching assistant. In 1951, he became an assistant researcher and associate researcher at Modern Physics Institute of CAS, and began to study nuclear physics theory under the supervision of Peng Huanwu.

Early 1958, with China-Soviet National Defense Contract, Yu and his colleagues including Deng Jiaxian, Sun Yuzhang etc. moved to No.221 Factory near Lake Qinghaihu.

From the end of 1960, Yu was involved in the theoretical research of nuclear weapons. His major contributions included the solutions to a series of fundamental and critical theoretical problems of nuclear weapons, which led to breakthrough of hydrogen bomb. He won the reputation and became the academician of Chinese Academy of Science for his design of H-bomb.

Yu's involvement with China's nuclear weapons program remained secret until his retirement in 1988. He was awarded the national top science award in January 2015. With the 5 million CNY prize, Yu founded the Yu Min Foundation to support scientific development in China.

Yu died in Beijing on 16 January 2019.

Personal life
Yu married Sun Yuqin, the couple had a son, Yu Xin, and a daughter, Yu Yuan.

References 

1926 births
2019 deaths
Yaohua High School alumni
National University of Peking alumni
Chinese nuclear physicists
Members of the Chinese Academy of Sciences
Physicists from Tianjin
Recipients of the Order of the Republic (China)